Lü Yi (吕亿) (born 10 April 1974) is a retired female Chinese middle distance runner who specialized in the 800 and 1500 metres.

Achievements

References

1974 births
Living people
Chinese female middle-distance runners